Horatio Benedict "Bennie" Blades Sr. (born September 3, 1966) is a former American football cornerback and safety in the National Football League (NFL).  He played college football at the University of Miami.

College career

Blades played a big part in the University of Miami's winning the 1987 NCAA National Championship. He also won the Jim Thorpe Award in that year and, in 2006, was named to the College Football Hall of Fame for his play at the University of Miami. He shares the University of Miami single season interception record with fellow Miami Hurricane Sean Taylor.

During his play at Miami he and the defensive secondary were nicknamed "Bennie and the Jets," (in reference of the Elton John song of the same name) for their  speed, power, ability & stand-out defensive play. He is also remembered for taunting and intimidating opposing players.

Blades was interviewed about his time at the University of Miami for the documentary The U, which premiered December 12, 2009 on ESPN.

Professional career

Following his graduation from the University of Miami, Blades entered the 1988 NFL Draft and spent ten seasons in the NFL. He played for the Detroit Lions from 1988 to 1996 and the 1997 season with the Seattle Seahawks, teaming up with his older brother, wide receiver Brian Blades, who also played collegiate football at the University of Miami.

During his time with the Lions, Blades was considered one of the most physical defensive backs in the NFL, even playing as a linebacker in certain passing situations toward the end of his career. Blades is widely considered to be one of the greatest defensive backs in Lions' history.

The Lions selected Blades with the third overall pick in the 1988 NFL Draft, and he went on to earn NFL All-Rookie honors for the 1988 season. He was selected to the Pro Bowl in 1991 - in addition to receiving First-team All-NFL and First-team All-NFC honors. He was the Lions’ Defensive MVP in 1992 and led the team with 78 tackles in 1996. He had two 100-tackle seasons in is first two seasons in Detroit.

An underrated professional player, Blades was a key component to the Lions’ defense that helped the team claim two NFC Central titles, and a berth in the 1991 NFC Championship game. He was a defensive captain for five years in Detroit and his 815 career tackles place him second on the Lions’ all-time list.

Personal life
Blades' has a blended family of 8 children: (3) boys Horatio (H.B.), Jaylen and Tylan; (5) girls Elice, Ashley, Amber, Bianca and Alyssa.

Each being a vital part of his life and success. Horatio (H.B.) also played in the NFL for 5 seasons.

Blades was honored September 25, 2015 as a GridIron Greats inductee.

References

External links
 "Bennie Blades: The Interview", The Miamist, May 31, 2006.

1966 births
Living people
All-American college football players
American football cornerbacks
American football safeties
College Football Hall of Fame inductees
Detroit Lions players
Miami Hurricanes football players
National Conference Pro Bowl players
Players of American football from Fort Lauderdale, Florida
Seattle Seahawks players
Piper High School (Florida) alumni
Ed Block Courage Award recipients